The 2016 FA WSL was the sixth edition of the FA WSL since it was formed in 2010. The WSL 1 was expanded to nine teams. The WSL 2 included one team promoted from the FA Women's Premier League for the first time. The season started on 23 March and Chelsea were the defending WSL 1 champions.

Manchester City won their first ever WSL 1 championship on 25 September 2016 with a 2–0 win over Chelsea.

Teams
WSL 1

WSL 2

Bristol Academy was renamed Bristol City before the season.

WSL 1

Table

Results

Top goalscorers

WSL 2

Bristol Academy were relegated from the WSL 1 last season and renamed Bristol City, while Sheffield became the first team to be promoted to the WSL 2 from the FA Women's Premier League.

Table

Results

 The match Millwall Lionesses vs Oxford United was initially postponed because Millwall's stadium, The Den, was being used for a men's game. The FA WSL Management Committee then decided to award the match to Oxford United.

Top goalscorers

WSL Cup
The FA WSL Cup format was changed to a true knock-out tournament. With 19 teams, the bottom six teams play a preliminary round. The round of 16 following that is seeded, so that WSL 1 teams meet WSL 2 teams, who have home advantage.

Preliminary round

| colspan="3"  style="background:#9cc; text-align:center;"|8 May 2016

First round

| colspan="3"  style="background:#9cc; text-align:center;"|2 July 2016

|-
| colspan="3"  style="background:#9cc; text-align:center;"|3 July 2016

Second round

| colspan="3"  style="background:#9cc; text-align:center;"|5 August 2016

|-
| colspan="3"  style="background:#9cc; text-align:center;"|7 August 2016

Semi-finals
Played on 3 and 4 September 2016.

Final
Played on 2 October 2016. Manchester City won their second cup after 2014 and completed the double.

References

External links
Official website
WSL Season at soccerway.com
WSL 2 Season at soccerway.com
League Cup at soccerway.com

Women's Super League seasons
1
1
Eng
Eng